Daulatpur  is a village in Kapurthala district of Punjab State, India. The village is administrated by a Sarpanch.

Demography 
According to the report published by Census India in 2011, Daulatpur has a total number of 26 houses and population of 128 of which include 68 males and 60 females. Literacy rate of Daulatpur is 79.41%, higher than state average of 75.84%. The population of children under the age of 6 years is 26 which is  20.31% of total population of Daulatpur, and child sex ratio is approximately  1000, higher than state average of 846.

Caste  
The village has schedule caste (SC) constitutes 39.06% of total population of the village and it doesn't have any Schedule Tribe (ST) population,

Population data

Air travel connectivity 
The closest airport to the village is Sri Guru Ram Dass Jee International Airport.

Villages in Kapurthala

External links
  Villages in Kapurthala
 Kapurthala Villages List

References

Villages in Kapurthala district